Jānis Lāčplēsis (born 8 October 1958 in Daugavpils) is Latvian financier, politician and former mayor of Daugavpils (2009-2011, 2013-2017). He was a member of the Latvian parliament during the 7th Saeima and the 11th Saeima.

References

External links

1958 births
Living people
Politicians from Daugavpils
Latvian Way politicians
Latvia's First Party/Latvian Way politicians
Latgale Party politicians
Deputies of the 7th Saeima
Deputies of the 11th Saeima
Riga Technical University alumni